The 22631 / 22632 Anuvrat AC Express is an AC Express train belonging to Indian Railways – Southern Railway zone that runs between  and  in India. This is the longest running AC Superfast Express in India.

It operates as train number 22631 from Madurai Junction to Bikaner Junction and as train number 22632 in the reverse direction, serving the states of Tamil Nadu, Andhra Pradesh, Telangana, Maharashtra, Madhya Pradesh and Rajasthan.

Coaches

The 22631 / 22632 Anuvrat AC Express has 1 AC First Class, 4 AC 2 tier, 14 AC 3 tier & 2 End on Generators. It also carries a pantry car..

As is customary with most train services in India, coach composition may be amended at the discretion of Indian Railways depending on demand.

Service

As the average speed of the train is above , as per Indian Railways rules, its fare includes a Superfast surcharge.

Routing

The 22631 / 22632 Anuvrat AC Express runs from Madurai Junction via Tiruchchirappalli Junction, Viluppuram Junction,  to Bikaner Junction   .

Direction reversal

Traction

Schedule

22631 Anuvrat AC Express runs from Madurai Junction every Thursday 11.55 hrs reaching Bikaner Junction on the Saturday at 16.00 hrs .
22632 Anuvrat AC Express runs from Bikaner Junction every Sunday at 15.00 hrs reaching Madurai Junction on Tuesday at 18.30 hrs .

References 

 http://www.thehindu.com/todays-paper/tp-national/tp-tamilnadu/new-weekly-train-service-between-chennai-central-bikaner/article5817200.ece
 https://www.youtube.com/watch?v=FM4q2HGiKGA
 https://web.archive.org/web/20140523061629/http://www.sr.indianrailways.gov.in/view_detail.jsp?lang=0&dcd=1924&id=0%2C4%2C268
 http://trainspy.com/static/train/22631/BKN-AC-SF-EXP

External links

Transport in Chennai
Transport in Bikaner
AC Express (Indian Railways) trains
Rail transport in Tamil Nadu
Rail transport in Andhra Pradesh
Rail transport in Telangana
Rail transport in Maharashtra
Rail transport in Madhya Pradesh
Rail transport in Rajasthan
Railway services introduced in 2014